Andreas Schaerer (born 17 December 1976) is a Swiss jazz vocalist and composer, performing internationally, and an academic teacher. He founded the sextet 'Hildegard Lernt Fliegen' and collaborated with notable international musicians, including Bobby McFerrin for the improvised opera Bobble.

Life and work 
Born in Visp, Schaerer grew up in Emmental and Wallis. He studied at the Lehrerseminar (teachers' seminary) in Hofwil, and received the patent for primary school and Realschule in 1997. He became guitar player for the punk band Hektor lebt. Schaerer travelled extensively in South America.

He founded his own projects, such as the sextet  (Hildegard learns to fly), touring a Europe up to Russia (Cinema Hildegard, 2010), and also to China. He writes for the sextet "skurrile Programme zwischen Kunstlied und aberwitzig-vertrackten Spielereien" (between art song and playfulness). He improvises in duos, with the bassist  and with the percussionist . He has performed in trio with Martin Eberle (born 1981, trumpet and flugelhorn) and the guitarist Peter Rom (born 1972), and with Christoph Steiner and Claude Meier (Das Beet). Schaerer is also active as a studio musician and composer in a variety of styles including free style and hip-hop, and writing music for computer games and animated films.

In 2009 and 2010, he collaborated with Bobby McFerrin for the improvised opera Bobble in Basel and Moscow. He has appeared with Soweto Kinch, Christy Dorans New Bag, Kaspar Ewald's Exorbitantes Kabinett, Colin Vallon, Elina Duni and Joe Haider. In 2017, he invited by Michael Wollny, then artist in residence of the Rheingau Musik Festival, to play at the Kurhaus Wiesbaden a concert with also saxophonist Émile Parisien and accordionist Vincent Peirani. A reviewer noted that he is interested, as the others, to expand the spectrum of his "instrument", and described his excentric-capricious vocal improvisations bordering percussive sounds, and a sometime "sacred" touch in the high register ("exzentrisch-kapriziösen Vokalimprovisationen auf der Grenze zum pointiert perkussionistischen Geräuschemacher über eine mitunter sakrale Anmutung in den Höhen").

Schaerer co-founded in 2007 with Marc Stucki and Benedikt Reising the Berner Jazzwerkstatt (Bern jazz workshop). He has taught at the Hochschule der Künste in Bern from 2009, jazz vocals, improvisation and ensemble playing.

Awards 
In 2008, his sextet Hildegard Lernt Fliegen was awarded the ZKB-Jazzpreis. The band has been sponsored from 2010 by Pro Helvetia. The Album Arcanum with Niggli was in 2014 on the list of the best of the Preis der deutschen Schallplattenkritik.

Vocal technique
Schaerer is known for his eclectic array of vocal styles, and is noted for incorporating multiple techniques into one song. He is noted for his extensive scat singing, and his wide variety of vocal timbres which include opera, crooning, soul, and sprechgesang. He is also noted for his usage of beatboxing, which he has been known to use as the primary percussive accompaniment in a number of his songs, occasionally while singing simultaneously. He often incorporates the Mouth trumpet technique, into his songs, harmonizing with the horn sections, of his groups.

Discography 
 Hildegard Lernt Fliegen, mit Roman Bieri, Katrin Lo Cher, Matthias Wenger, Patrick Schnyder, Marco Mueller, Christoph Steiner, 2007
 schibboleth, with Bänz Oester, 2010) (Unit)
 At the Age of Six I Wanted to Be a Cook, Rom/Schaerer/Eberle, 2013 (Unit)

References

External links 
 
 Hildegard lernt fliegen
 
  Der Halsbrecher / Die BBC ist hinter ihm her. Die Russen und die Chinesen auch. Andreas Schaerer ist einer der staunenswertesten Sänger der Berner Musikszene. Ein Porträt. Der Bund
 Andreas Schaerer / The Big Wig - CD & DVD Set actmusic.com
 Andreas Schaerer / Out Of Land - CD actmusic.com

Swiss jazz singers
Swiss jazz composers
Avant-garde jazz composers
Free jazz composers
20th-century jazz composers
21st-century jazz composers
Academic staff of the Bern University of Applied Sciences
1976 births
Living people
21st-century Swiss singers
Intakt Records artists
20th-century Swiss composers
21st-century Swiss composers